The 1998–99 BBL season was the 12th season of the British Basketball League, known as the Budweiser Basketball League for sponsorship reasons, since its establishment in 1987. The regular season commenced on September 12, 1998, and ended on April 4, 1999, with a total of 13 teams competing, playing 36 games each. The post-season Play-offs began on April 9 and culminated in the end-of-season finale on May 2 at Wembley Arena.

Start-up franchise Edinburgh Rocks became the League's newest member following their addition as the 14th franchise during the pre-season and the first Scottish team to appear in the top-flight since Glasgow Rangers' participation in the 1988–89 season. The League membership was reduced to 13 teams shortly after following the merger of the London Towers and Crystal Palace franchises, whilst another notable change was the uprooting of Watford Royals, who moved to the Bletchley Centre in Milton Keynes to become the Milton Keynes Lions.

Sheffield Sharks were a dominant force throughout the season, winning the Sainsbury's Classic Cola Cup whilst storming the Budweiser League and taking the Championship to complete the "Double". The campaign came down to a memorable final game where Sharks claimed the title from rivals Manchester Giants with the last shot of the game, winning 85–87 to take the crown. Their successful run fell short in the play-offs however, managing only a third-placed finish thus allowing a new-look London Towers to claim the title. Manchester Giants also ended a decade-long drought of silverware with their win in the uni-ball Trophy.

No teams participated in European competition after Birmingham Bullets and Greater London Leopards both declined to compete in the Saporta Cup.

Notable occurrences 
 Edinburgh Rocks were officially announced as the League's newest franchise on 4 June 1998 – though the Rocks nickname was revealed at a later date – with former NBA player Jim Brandon signed as the team's head coach.
 The London Towers and Crystal Palace teams merged their organisations during the close-season, with the new franchise continuing to use the London Towers branding and utilising the home venues of both clubs, Crystal Palace National Sports Centre and Wembley Arena for home games.
 Watford Royals owner Vince Macaulay announced on 19 June that he was moving the franchise to Milton Keynes due to a lack of suitable venues for home games in Watford, after plans for a new 3,000-capacity arena in Watford, to be built in partnership with Watford F.C., fell through.
 The Budweiser League game between Chester Jets and Derby Storm on 31 January 1999 was abandoned after 30 seconds due to a court invasion from both sets of players following a fight between Chester's Sean Hartley and Derby's England international Yorick Williams. Media reports claim it was the most serious incident in the history of competitive basketball in Britain. Four players were initially ejected from the game, including Williams and Hartley, whilst Chester physio Alison Troughtman was taken to hospital, suffering from a suspected broken-jaw. It was later announced that Williams was suspended for the remainder of the regular season, whilst Derby's Rico Alderson was banned until the following season.
 The Southern All-Stars were victorious in the annual All-Star Game against their Northern rivals, with a 156–158 win at Newcastle Arena on February 27. Edinburgh's Ted Berry was the game-high scorer with 29 points and was named as the games Most Valuable Player.
 Manchester Giants claimed their first piece of silverware in franchise history after defeating Derby in the uni-ball Trophy Final on 13 March. Giants won 90–69, and the 21-point gap between the two teams was the biggest winning margin in the event's history.
 Furthering their ongoing disciplinary issues, it was revealed in April that Derby Storm's American player Maurice Robinson was issued with a one-year suspension for failing to supply a complete urine sample during a Sports Council doping control test.
 The Budweiser League came down to a memorable final game between title-chasing rivals Sheffield Sharks and Manchester Giants in-front of more than 11,000 fans at the MEN Arena. With both teams tied on points at the top of the League table, and tied at 85–85 with just 3.5 seconds left in the game, Terrell Myers took the pass and his 18 ft buzzer-beating jump-shot claimed the title for Sheffield.
 London Towers were crowned as Budweiser League Play-off champions on 2 May, after defeating Thames Valley Tigers 82–71 at Wembley Arena. Towers' Malcolm Leak lead the game's scoring, posting 20 points.
 Nottingham-based businessman Craig Bown purchased the Birmingham Bullets franchise at the end of the season for a reported six-figure sum.

Budweiser League Championship (Tier 1)

Final standings

The play-offs

Quarter-finals 
(1) Sheffield Sharks vs. (8) Greater London Leopards

(2) Manchester Giants vs. (7) Birmingham Bullets

(3) London Towers vs. (5) Newcastle Eagles

(4) Thames Valley Tigers vs. (6) Derby Storm

Semi-finals

Third-place game

Final

National League Division 1 (Tier 2)

Final standings 

Champions by virtue of head-to-head record*

Playoffs
Quarter-finals

Semi-finals

Final

National League Division 2 (Tier 3)

Final standings

Playoffs
Quarter-finals

Semi-finals

Final

National League Division 3 (Tier 4)

Final standings

Playoffs
Quarter-finals

Semi-finals

Final

Sainsbury's Classic Cola National Cup

Last 16

Quarter-finals

Semi-finals

Final

uni-ball Trophy

Group stage 
Group A
Group B

Quarter-finals

Semi-finals 
Derby Storm vs. Leicester Riders

Sheffield Sharks vs. Manchester Giants

Final

Dairylea Dunkers All-Star Game

Statistics leaders

Seasonal awards 

 Most Valuable Player: Terrell Myers (Sheffield Sharks)
 Coach of the Year: Chris Finch (Sheffield Sharks)
 All-Star First Team:
 Terrell Myers (Sheffield Sharks)
 John White (Manchester Giants)
 Tony Dorsey (Manchester Giants)
 John McCord (Thames Valley Tigers)
 Nigel Lloyd (Birmingham Bullets)
 All-Star Second Team:
 Tim Moore (Greater London Leopards)
 Travis Conlan (Sheffield Sharks)
 Ralph Blalock (Newcastle Eagles)
 Casey Arena (Thames Valley Tigers)
 Danny Lewis (London Towers)

References 

British Basketball League seasons
1
British